Janete dos Santos (born 10 June 1991) is an Angolan handball player for Primeiro de Agosto and the Angolan national team.

She participated at the 2015 World Women's Handball Championship and at the 2016 Summer Olympics.

References

External links

1991 births
Living people
Angolan female handball players
Olympic handball players of Angola
Handball players at the 2016 Summer Olympics
Competitors at the 2019 African Games
African Games gold medalists for Angola
African Games medalists in handball
People from Luanda